Frankie Yick Chi-ming, SBS (born 1953) is an engineer, businessman and member of the Legislative Council of Hong Kong for the Transport functional constituency. He was awarded the Silver Bauhinia Star by the Hong Kong SAR Government in 2017.

Background
Yick received a Bachelor of Engineering from the University of Hong Kong and Master of Science in Management from the University of Birmingham. He became fellow of the Chartered Institute of Logistics and Transport,  chartered engineer of the Engineering Council and corporate member of the Institution of Engineering and Technology and the Chartered Institute of Purchasing and Supply, all United Kingdom institutions.

Yick has worked extensively in the public transportation and logistics industry. He joined Wharf in 1994 and has been its company director. He has been managing director and director of two of its subsidiaries, Star Ferry Company and Hong Kong Tramways, respectively. He also serves as a director of Hong Kong Air Cargo Terminals Limited, an associate.  Yick also held a non-executive director position in Harbour Centre Development in July 2012.

In 1998, he served in the Election Committee for the Transport constituency.  Later that year, he was elected to the Legislative Council of Hong Kong as an uncontested candidate, representing the Liberal Party, succeeding incumbent Miriam Lau. He has been a director of the Airport Authority Hong Kong since 1 June 2014.

References

1953 births
Living people
Liberal Party (Hong Kong) politicians
HK LegCo Members 2012–2016
HK LegCo Members 2016–2021
HK LegCo Members 2022–2025
Hong Kong businesspeople
Hong Kong Christians
Hong Kong engineers
Members of the Election Committee of Hong Kong, 2007–2012
Members of the Election Committee of Hong Kong, 2012–2017
The Wharf (Holdings)
Alumni of the University of Hong Kong
Alumni of the University of Birmingham
Recipients of the Silver Bauhinia Star